Dundrod Circuit  is a motorsport street circuit used for the Ulster Trophy for Formula One and Formula Two cars from 1950 to 1953, the RAC Tourist Trophy for sports cars between 1950 and 1955, and for the motorcycle Ulster Grand Prix from 1953 onwards. It is situated near the village of Dundrod in Lisburn, Northern Ireland. The nearby Clady Circuit also in County Antrim was used for the Ulster Grand Prix between (1922–1952) before moving to the Dundrod Circuit.

History
For the 1953 racing season the Clady Circuit was abandoned for motor-cycle racing and the Ulster Grand Prix as part of the FIM Motorcycle Grand Prix World Championship and was moved to the nearby Dundrod Circuit in Co Antrim. The circuit comprised public roads closed for racing including a section of the secondary B38 Hannahstown Road between Glenavy and Hannahstown, Co Antrim, the secondary B101 Leathemstown Road from Leathemstown Corner to Dundrod and the B154 Quarterland/Tornagrough Road from Cochranstown to the road junction of the B38 Upper Springsfield Road/Hannahstown Road at the Lindsay Hairpin. After 1955 cars stopped racing there due to no less than 3 fatalities during the 1955 TT race and safety concerns with the narrow, high-speed nature of the circuit, and since then it has only been used for motorcycle racing.

The photo below shows the original much tighter hairpin, with the modern hairpin, known now as the Lindsay Hairpin, being slightly further back up the road.

Speed and race records

The lap record for the Dundrod Circuit is 3 minutes and 17.928 seconds at an average speed of  set by Dean Harrison riding a Kawasaki Ninja ZX-10R during the 2017 Ulster Grand Prix. The race record for the Dundrod Circuit is an average speed of  set by Bruce Anstey during the 2017 Ulster Grand Prix.

The lap record for the RAC Tourist Trophy on the Dundrod Circuit is 4 minutes and 42 seconds at an average speed of  held by Mike Hawthorn driving a Jaguar D-Type set during the 1955 RAC Tourist Trophy.

The 1971 Ulster Grand Prix held on the Dundrod Circuit was won by Australian Jack Findlay in what was the Ulster Grand Prix's last year as part of the FIM Grand Prix international motorcycle racing calendar. Findlay's victory on a Suzuki was also notable for marking the first 500cc class win for a motorcycle powered by a two stroke engine.

Race lap records
The fastest official race lap records at the Dundrod Circuit are listed as:

See also
 Clady Circuit
 Ulster Grand Prix
 North West 200
 Isle of Man TT Races
 RAC Tourist Trophy

Notes

References

External links
 Map of the Course
 BBC Website TT winners team up for Ulster GP

Motorsport venues in Northern Ireland
Motorcycle Road Racing Venues
Grand Prix motorcycle circuits
Sports venues in County Antrim